Snowy Shaw (born Tommie Mike Christer Helgesson on 25 July 1968) is a Swedish heavy metal musician (primarily a drummer) based in the port city of Gothenburg in the west coast of Sweden. He has played with many heavy metal bands, like King Diamond, Dream Evil, Mercyful Fate, IllWill, Notre Dame and Memento Mori. Snowy is adept at playing guitar as well as drums. He is a primary songwriter in Dream Evil. In October 2006, Snowy joined the symphonic metal band Therion, singing on the Gothic Kabbalah album and participated in the 2007 tour together with already established singer Mats Levén. In August 2010, he was announced as the new bassist and clean vocalist of symphonic black metal band Dimmu Borgir, although he was only officially a member for one day then quit and rejoined Therion.

Discography

With King Diamond 
The Eye (1990)

With Mercyful Fate 
Time (1994)

With Memento Mori 
Rhymes of Lunacy (1993)
Life, Death, and Other Morbid Tales (1994)

With Notre Dame 
Coming Soon to a Théatre Near You!!! (1998)
Le Théâtre du Vampire (1999)
Nightmare Before Christmas (1999)
Abattoir, Abattoir du Noir (2000)
Coming Soon to a Theatre Near You, the 2nd (2002)
Demi Monde Bizarros (2004)
Creepshow Freakshow Peepshow (2005)

With Dream Evil 
Dragonslayer (2002)
Evilized (2003)
Children of the Night (EP, 2003)
The First Chapter (EP, 2004)
The Book of Heavy Metal (2004)
Gold Medal in Metal (2005)

With Loud 'N' Nasty 
No One Rocks Like You (2007; produced by Snowy Shaw)

With Therion 
Gothic Kabbalah (2007)
Live Gothic (2008)
Sitra Ahra (2010)
Les Fleurs du Mal (2012)
Live in Atlanta Adulruna Rediviva and Beyond (2007)

With Dimmu Borgir 
Abrahadabra (2010)

With XXX (pronounced Triple X) 
Currently Snowy Shaw works with the band XXX making glitter rock. Their debut album, Heaven, Hell or Hollywood, was recorded, mixed and mastered by Andy La Rocque in the Sonic Train Studios. They have been signed by King Records/Japan.

With Theatres des Vampires 
Moonlight Waltz (2011)

With Snowy Shaw 
Snowy Shaw is Alive! (2011)
The Liveshow: 25 Years of Madness in the Name of Metal (2014)
Live in Hell! (2015)
White Is the New Black (2018)

With Opera Diabolicus 
†1614 (2012)
Death on a Pale Horse (2021)

With Mad Architect 
Journey to Madness (2013)
Hang High (2015)

With Dark Embrace 
The call of the wolves (2017)
Dark Heavy Metal (2023)

With Barndoom med Snömannen & Hans Vänner 
Self-titled (2017)
Kråksång & Rävspel (2017)

With Poison Pill 
Poison Pill (2017)

With Snowy Shaw 
Be Kind to Animals or I'll Kill You (2018)

References

External links

1969 births
Black metal musicians
King Diamond (band) members
Living people
Mercyful Fate members
People from Gothenburg
Swedish heavy metal guitarists
Swedish heavy metal singers
Swedish heavy metal drummers
Swedish multi-instrumentalists
Swedish singer-songwriters
Therion (band) members
Dream Evil members
Memento Mori (band) members
Dimmu Borgir members